Ridderkerkse Voetbal Vereniging Hercules, known as RVVH is a Dutch football, based in Ridderkerk. Since 2018, its main male squad competes in the Hoofdklasse.

RVVH has a highly successful women's squad. It played most years in the Topklasse since this league was started, including when the Topklasse was the top tier of Dutch women soccer. Former women players of RVVH, including in the youth, include Leyla Bağcı, Jeanine van Dalen, Manon Melis,  and Nikki de Roest.

Chief coach
 J. de Bruin (in the 1940s and 1950s)
 Arie van der Graaf ?–1963
 C.? Molenveld 1963–1966
 Henk den Boer, 1966–1969
 Daan den Bleijker, 1969–1970
 Joop Herwig, 1970–1971
 Cor van der Gijp, 1971–1972
 Gerard Weber, 1972–1976
 Ad van Dongen, 1976–1979
 Ton de Hoop, 1979–1982
 Hans van der Wekke, 1982–1983
 Gerrie Ter Horst, 1983–1985
 John Huegenin, 1985–1987
 Ronald Klinkerberg, 1997–2001
 Ruud Heus, 2004–2006
 Jan Everse, 2009–2010
 Theo de Boon, 2010–2103
 Giovanni Franken, 2013–2018
 Ronald Hulsbosch, 2018-2020
 Kevin Vink, Since 2020

References

External links
 Official website

 
Football clubs in the Netherlands
Football clubs in Ridderkerk
Association football clubs established in 1918
1918 establishments in the Netherlands